Rue de la Pompe is a street in Paris, France, which was named after the pump which served water to the castle of Muette. With a length of 1690 metres, Rue de la Pompe is one of the longest streets in the 16th arrondissement. It runs from Avenue Paul Doumer (in the district of Muette) to Avenue Foch (in the district of Porte Dauphine).

Originally, it was a small way and first mentioned in 1730. For a long time, Rue de la Pompe, which runs from South to North, was together with Rue de Longchamp (which runs from East to West) the main axis of Passy whose terrain was mainly used for agricultural reasons until it became a part of Paris on 1 January 1860.

Residence of famous people 

The house with number 1 lies in the southern part of the street and (with view from there) on the left side. Brigitte Bardot has spent a part of her childhood here.

Just a few steps further on the same side of the street – at the place where today is house number 11 – once stood a country house in which the writer and journalist Jules Janin moved around 1850: "It surely needs a lot of courage to settle in this wilderness, on a scarcely discernible way. The first three winters we have spent alone here, surrounded by this frightening isolation and this total silence."
During the summer of 2010 Jessica Talley, noted American photographer and dancer lived with the notorious socialite Eliza F M Wright on the top floor of number 11. 

In direct neighborhood grew up at nearly the same time the writer and caricaturist George du Maurier who was born on 6 March 1834 in Paris. In his first novel Peter Ibbetson (published in 1891), which has some autobiographical tendencies, the author is telling about happy days of childhood in the Rue de la Pompe:

"Our house, an old yellow house with green shutters and Mansard-roofs of slate, stood between the garden and the street - a long winding street ... on either side of the street (which was called "the Street of the Pump"), as far as the eye could reach looking west, were dwelling-houses just like our own, only agreeably different; and garden walls overtopped with the foliage of horse-chestnut, sycamore, acacia, and lime; and here and there huge portals and iron gates defended by posts of stone gave ingress to mysterious abodes of brick and plaster and granite, many-shuttered, and embosomed in sun-shot greenery." 

Not only his granddaughter, the writer Daphne du Maurier, was of the opinion that his depictions brought to life again old Passy and the Rue de la Pompe: "Kicky … was a happy little boy – or so he believed, when fifty years later he wrote about his childhood in Peter Ibbetson – and the scents and sounds of pre-imperial Paris, the rumble of wheels on cubbled stones, the crack of a whip, the white dust at the corner of the Rue de la Pompe, the chestnut trees in flower – even the small burnt bread, black coffee, and tobacco on the warm spring air – rise from the pages of his novel …"

Wistfully, George du Maurier has also dealt with the rapid alterations, Passy had been involved - especially as a result of the annexation to Paris on 1 January 1860. 12 years after he had been taken away from his beloved Passy to London by his uncle, his protagonist Peter Ibbetson returns to Passy for the first time: the old house was no more, but in its place a much larger and smarter edifice of sculptured stone. Also from the trusted apple-tree remained the stump only. But the old gate at least had not disappeared. "I feasted my sorrowful eyes on these poor remains, that looked snubbed and shabby and out of place in the midst of all this new splendor."

The old park hedge, which they often had crossed through a gap inside it, to get faster to and from the Bois de Boulogne, had also disappeared and "the very park itself was gone, cut up, demolished, all parcelled out into small gardens with trim white villas, except where a railway ran through a deep cutting in the chalk. A train actually roared and panted by, and choked me with its filthy steam as I looked round in stupefaction on the ruins of my long-cherished hope."

At what is now a junction of Rue de la Pompe and Rue de Siam, between buildings numbered 43 and 45, there used to stand a hotel of unidentified name. In 1877-1880 it was inhabited by Carlos de Borbón, the Carlist claimant to the throne of Spain, his wife Margarita de Bourbon-Parme, their 5 children and the quasi-court of royal servants, assistants, advisers and secretaries. At that time Rue de la Pompe was home to international politics, intrigues and police surveillance. As the presence of the Carlist claimant was increasingly inconvenient for the French authorities, he was made to leave the country in 1880. Some time afterwards the hotel building was demolished upon construction of Rue de Siam.

Some decades letter grew up another writer in the same street - and his childhood memories sound very similarly atrabilious like the narration by Du Maurier: "When I stroll around Passy I feel like wandering inside myself and always I am faced with my own childhood."

With the same melancholy, Du Maurier felt a century before, Julien Green is also writing about the many changes his home has suffered in time: "It is amazing how a quarter century could deprive all the former charm from this part of town. I know that it is useless and ridiculous to moan about vanished stones, but my impression is without leniency when I have a look at these tenements which are now occupy the heights in which I remember to have seen many old-fashioned elegant villas, and gardens who kept their silence and the singing of the birds like treasures." "And when I stroll down from the heights of Passy to the banks of the Seine, I sometimes ask myself where I am and if I have not dreamed."

Green lived on the left side of Rue de la Pompe (there where the odd numbers are) and visited Lycée Janson de Sailly with number 106, just across the street. Because he heard nothing but English at home (his parents were Americans) and nothing but French in school, Green described the Rue de la Pompe as "my Atlantic Ocean".

Also in opposite to the mentioned high school lived the French general Joseph Jacques Césaire Joffre (1852-1931) for 10 years, as a commemorative plaque on house number 115 reveals. 

Virginia Oldoini, Countess di Castiglione, an early photographic artist, secret agent, courtesan and mistress to royalty, was bought a small house on the street by Napoleon III in 1857.

In 1919, an apartment at 115 rue de la Pompe became the home of Irène Némirovsky, author of David Golder, Le Bal, and Suite Francaise, among other novels.

References